Counterion condensation is a phenomenon described by Manning's
theory (Manning 1969), which assumes that counterions can condense 
onto polyions until the charged density between neighboring monomer charges 
along the polyion chain is reduced below a certain critical value. In the model the 
real polyion chain is replaced by an idealized line charge, where the polyion 
is represented by a uniformly charged thread of zero radius, infinite
length and finite charge density, and the condensed counterion layer is 
assumed to be in physical equilibrium with the ionic atmosphere surrounding 
the polyion. The uncondensed mobile ions in the ionic atmosphere are treated 
within the Debye–Hückel (DH) approximation. The 
phenomenon of counterion condensation now takes place when the dimensionless 
Coulomb coupling strength 
, 
where  represents the Bjerrum length and 
 the distance between neighboring charged monomers. 
In this case the Coulomb interactions dominate over 
the thermal interactions and counterion condensation is favored. For many standard 
polyelectrolytes, this phenomenon is relevant, since the 
distance between neighboring monomer charges typically ranges between 2 and 3 Å and 
 7 Å in water.
At infinite dilution the Manning radius diverges and the actual concentration of ions close to the charged rod is reduced (in agreement with the law of dilution).

Criticism 
The counterion condensation originally only describes the behaviour of a charged rod. It competes here with Poisson-Boltzmann theory, which was shown to give less artificial results than the counterion condensation theories.

References 

 

 

Polyelectrolytes
Salts